Dioptis cyma is a moth of the family Notodontidae first described by Jacob Hübner in 1818. It is found in Peru, Brazil and French Guiana.

References

External links
Species page at Tree of Life Web Project

Moths described in 1818
Notodontidae of South America